Mark Andrew Twitchell (born July 4, 1979) is a Canadian filmmaker convicted of first-degree murder in April 2011 for the murder of John Brian Altinger. His trial attracted particular media attention because Twitchell had allegedly been inspired by the fictional character Dexter Morgan.

Early life and filmmaking ambitions 
Born in Edmonton, Alberta, Twitchell dreamed of making blockbuster films and graduated from the Radio and Television Arts program at the Northern Alberta Institute of Technology in 2000. In 2001, Twitchell married an American woman and moved to Illinois, but they divorced in 2004. 

In 2007, Twitchell directed Star Wars: Secrets of the Rebellion, a full-length fan film prequel set a few days prior to Star Wars Episode IV: A New Hope. Secrets of the Rebellion included a cameo by Jeremy Bulloch, a British actor best known for his role as bounty hunter Boba Fett in the original Star Wars films. The film, still in post-production, never saw release. Twitchell also scripted Day Players, a buddy comedy. In September 2008, he shot a short horror film entitled House of Cards at a garage he rented in the south end of Edmonton.

Murder of Johnny Altinger
In October 2008, John Brian Altinger, 38-year-old former White Rock, B.C., oilfield equipment manufacturer known to his friends as Johnny, unknowingly interacted with Twitchell on dating website Plenty of Fish. On October 10, 2008, Altinger informed his friends of his plans to meet a woman with whom he had been chatting.  Altinger discovered too late that Twitchell had posed as the woman online in order to lure him into a "kill room" set up in a rented garage being used as a film-studio. Twitchell bludgeoned and stabbed Altinger, before cutting him apart, partially burning him, and then dumping his remains in garbage bags into a storm sewer.

Altinger's friends became concerned after they received emails supposedly from Altinger claiming that his date had taken him on an extended vacation to Costa Rica. At work, a resignation letter arrived by email, but there was no response to a request for a forwarding address for sending a final paycheck. Altinger's friends broke into his condominium, where they found his passport, dirty dishes, and no indication of his having packed for a trip. A homicide investigation was soon launched by the Edmonton Police Service.

Twitchell related an improbable account to police of having met Altinger before his trip to Costa Rica. According to Twitchell, Altinger sold his Mazda 6 to Twitchell for 40 CAD, all the cash Twitchell had on hand. The police, not believing this story, impounded Twitchell's laptop and car, and found Altinger's blood in the car's trunk. Police arrested Twitchell on October 31, 2008, and, on the same day, charged him with the first-degree murder of Altinger.

Trial and sentencing 
The key piece of evidence presented by the Crown at Twitchell's first-degree murder trial was a document, entitled "SKConfessions", which stood for "Serial Killer Confessions". The document had been recovered from Twitchell's laptop, despite having been deleted. The document begins with the passage: This story is based on true events. The names and events were altered slightly to protect the guilty. This is the story of my progression into becoming a serial killer. It presented an account of its narrator's planning, failed first attempt, and successful second attempt to lure a man to his garage and murder him, with fake online dating profiles used as bait. It went on to describe the process of dismembering the body and attempts to dispose of the remains.

During his trial, Twitchell admitted to killing Altinger and authoring the document, but claimed he had acted in self-defense. He described the document as fiction based on fact, as if he had planned Altinger's death deliberately, in order to craft a compelling story. 

During the trial, Twitchell's interest in the television series Dexter was noted repeatedly, and his personal identification with its lead character, Dexter Morgan, a vigilante serial killer, prompted several media outlets to refer to him as the "Dexter Killer."

Another document found on Twitchell's laptop did not make its way into the evidence file for the jury to read during his trial. Entitled "A Profile of a Psychopath", and believed by investigators to have been written by Twitchell, it is a detailed self-analysis of personality and behavior. 
On April 12, 2011, Twitchell was convicted of first-degree murder for the death of Altinger, and sentenced to life in prison without possibility for parole for 25 years.

Attempted murder charge
Twitchell still faced an attempted murder charge for his alleged attack on Gilles Tetreault, a computer company contractor. Tetreault testified that he was lured using the website Plenty of Fish, expecting a date with a young woman named Sheena, only to be attacked by a man in a hockey mask with a stun baton when he arrived at the garage in Edmonton rented by Twitchell. After a violent struggle, Tetreault escaped, but did not report the attack to police. Tetreault claims that he did not report the attack because he was embarrassed. Tetreault was nicknamed 'The One Who Got Away' by several media outlets.

Crown prosecutors considered pursuing a charge of attempted murder after securing a conviction of first-degree murder. Detectives were adamant that they had gathered a mountain of evidence – much of it revealed during the murder trial – while even Twitchell himself admitted on the witness stand to committing the attack. In preparing the case for trial, the Crown had argued in court for the attempted murder and first-degree murder charges to be heard simultaneously as they were part of the same "transaction" of his attempt to become a serial killer. Under Canadian law, charges can only be heard together if they are linked in some way. Court of Queen's Bench Justice Terry Clackson was not convinced by the prosecution's argument that the attack on Gilles Tetreault and the murder of Johnny Altinger were part of the same transaction. He ordered the charges to be severed and heard separately. "The offences are related and connected, but remain discrete," Justice Clackson wrote in his reasons for the decision, "As a result, the attempted murder charge cannot stand on the same indictment as the charge of murder because they are different transactions." On June 17, 2011, an attempted murder charge against Twitchell was stayed in the Court of Queen's Bench of Alberta, meaning that Crown prosecutors could resurrect the charge within a one-year period. Since his conviction of first-degree murder secured a maximum sentence — life in prison with no parole eligibility for 25 years — there was no need to proceed with more charges, and the attempted murder charge against Twitchell was eventually dropped.

Media coverage during trial
Extensive media coverage of the case created debate both inside and outside of the courtroom. Observers argued for and against the media's reporting on the more sensational details of the crime.

Prior to the criminal trial, Crown prosecutors and the defense sought vast publication bans and sealing orders over the police evidence, preventing the media from reporting on the details of the case until the jury would hear it during the future trial. The media fought the application, but the judge agreed to both a sealing order and publication ban, stating in his ruling that "there is a real risk that pretrial publicity will undermine the accused's constitutionally protected right to a fair trial." The jury pool was then polled through a "challenge for cause" procedure to determine if a potential juror had been influenced by the media coverage prior to the publication bans taking effect. When the bans were lifted, a large media presence attended and reported on the trial, including American television programs Dateline NBC and 48 Hours.

Following his first-degree murder conviction, Twitchell used the extensive media coverage of his case as grounds for an appeal. He argued in his notice of appeal that "the media attention surrounding my case was so extensive, so blatant and so overtly sensationalized that it is unreasonable to expect any unsequestered jury to have remained uninfluenced by it, regardless of judges' instructions in the charge." He abandoned his appeal in 2012.

Post-trial media coverage
In December 2012, Michael C. Hall, the actor who played Dexter Morgan, was interviewed by Jian Ghomeshi on the Canadian radio show Q. Hall stated that he did not think Dexter glamorized serial killers. "I would hope that people's appreciation was more than some sort of fetishization with the kill scenes," he said. Ghomeshi brought up Twitchell and Hall said, "I wouldn't stop making Dexter because someone was fascinated by it only in that way. I try to tell myself that their fixated nature would have done it one way or the other, but it seems that Dexter had something to do with it. It's horrifying."

In May 2013, it was reported that Twitchell had purchased a television for his prison cell. Twitchell stated that he had caught up on every Dexter episode that he missed since he was arrested and convicted of first-degree murder.

Twitchell's case was featured in the American magazine Crime Watch Daily on May 1, 2017. Much of that day's program focused on Twitchell's methods and featured interviews with Gilles Tetrault, his first intended victim, and Steve Lillebuen, author of the book The Devil's Cinema, which focused on the case. Part of the report included a return trip by Tetreault to the garage in which the incident had taken place.

Tetreault made several media appearances related to his experience, including Dateline NBC, 48 Hours Mystery, The Fifth Estate, I Survived... on Biography Channel, Dates from Hell on Investigation Discovery, and The Security Brief on REELZ.

Books about the case
 The Devil's Cinema (2012) by Steve Lillebuen, a true crime account of the case and trial, written with the cooperation of Twitchell. 
 The One Who Got Away (2015) by Gilles Tetreault, a personal account by the original intended target of Twitchell. 1st Edition. Triplicity Publishing. ; 2nd Edition. CreateSpace Independent Publishing Platform.

See also
 Internet homicide
 Murder of Jun Lin

References

External links
 
 48 Hours: "Screenplay for Murder" (2012)
 SKConfessions Manuscript
Mark Twitchell's Profile of a Psychopath
 Email exchange between Altinger and Twitchell posing as a dating woman

1979 births
Living people
Film directors from Edmonton
Prisoners sentenced to life imprisonment by Canada
Canadian prisoners sentenced to life imprisonment
Canadian people convicted of murder
People convicted of murder by Canada
Crime in Edmonton
21st-century Canadian criminals
Canadian male criminals
Dexter (series)